"" is the tenth single by Japanese singer Angela Aki, released on April 14, 2010. It varies in style from her previous singles, being the first to feature Aki playing guitar, rather than her normal prominent piano arrangements.

Track listing

Charts

References

External links 
 Official Discography 

2010 singles
Angela Aki songs
Japanese-language songs
2010 songs
Songs written by Angela Aki
Sony Music Entertainment Japan singles